The flag of the state of Maryland is the 17th-century heraldic banner of arms of Cecil, 2nd Baron Baltimore. It consists of the arms of his father George, 1st Baron Baltimore (1579–1632), quartered with those of his grandmother, heiress of the Crossland family. The flag was officially adopted by the General Assembly of Maryland (state legislature) in 1904.

History

The Maryland colony was founded by The 2nd Baron Baltimore (1605–1675), which was granted to him as the son and heir of The 1st Baron Baltimore by King Charles I, hence the use of his banner of arms as the flag. During the colonial period, only the gold (yellow) and black Calvert arms were associated with Maryland. The state stopped using the colors following American independence, but they were reintroduced in 1854.

The red and white cross bottony counterchanged had gained popularity during the American Civil War. Maryland had remained loyal to the U.S. despite a large proportion of the citizenry's support for the Confederacy, especially in the central city of Baltimore, the counties of the southern part of the state, and the Eastern Shore of the Chesapeake Bay. Those Marylanders who supported the Confederacy, many of whom fought in the Army of Northern Virginia of Robert E. Lee, adopted the Crossland banner (seen as "secession colors") and often used a metal bottony cross pinned to their gray uniforms or caps (kepis). The black and gold bend dexter counterchanged of the Barons Baltimore was used in the flags and devices and pinned on the uniforms of Union Army regiments in the Army of the Potomac. After the war, Marylanders who had fought on either side of the conflict returned to their state in need of reconciliation.

The present design, which incorporates both of the coats of arms used by George Calvert, began to appear officially after the Civil War. The flag in its present form was first flown in Baltimore, on October 11, 1880, at a parade marking the 150th anniversary of the founding of Baltimore (1729–1730). It was flown again on October 25, 1888, at the Gettysburg Battlefield during ceremonies dedicating monuments to the Maryland regiments of the Army of the Potomac by reorganized regiments of the former state militia, now the Maryland National Guard.

The flag was not officially adopted as the state flag until 1904. The present flag is symbolic of the reunion of all the citizens in the state and is represented through the colors of the flag.

In 2001, a survey conducted by the North American Vexillological Association placed Maryland's flag fourth best in design quality out of the 72 flags of the provinces of Canada, the U.S. states, and the territories of the United States. It finished behind the flags of New Mexico, Texas and Quebec respectively.

Previous designs
Post-independence and the discontinuation of the Calvert flag, many banners were used to represent Maryland. By the Civil War, the most common design representing all of Maryland consisted of the seal of Maryland on a blue background.  It is worth noting that pre-1876 the Maryland seal did not include the current Maryland flag on it. These banners were unofficial, and designs varied. It is not known the exact specifications of these banners.

Current design
The banner of arms of the Barons Baltimore, the present flag is a quartered field with the arms of The 1st Baron Baltimore in the canton (1st quarter) and the lower fly (4th quarter), with the arms of Alicia Crossland in the upper fly and lower hoist (2nd and 3rd quarters).

In the black and gold quarters of the flag is the arms of The 1st Baron Baltimore, a former Secretary of State, granted as a reward for his storming a fortification during a battle. (The vertical bars approximate the bars of the palisade.) The red and white quarter is the coat of arms of the Crossland family, the family of Lord Baltimore's mother from South Crosland in West Yorkshire, England, and consists of a cross bottony with the red and white sides of the cross alternating. Since Lord Baltimore's mother was a heraldic heiress, he was entitled to use both arms in his banner of arms. Upon the death of George, Lord Baltimore, in April 1632, the right to bear the arms and banner passed to his eldest son Cecil, 2nd Baron Baltimore, to whom the Province of Maryland was granted that same year.

The heraldic blazon is: Quarterly, 1st and 4th, paly of six Or and Sable, a bend counterchanged (for Calvert); 2nd and 3rd, quarterly argent and gules, a cross bottony counterchanged (for Crossland).

Color scheme

Uses

The Calvert and Crossland arms and banner, and the Maryland flag itself, have been adapted for use in various ways across the state.

Official
The gold and black Calvert coat of arms and red and white Crossland coat of arms are featured in the seal of the town of Ferryland, Newfoundland, the present-day site of Calvert's Colony of Avalon.
Some Maryland counties and municipalities have arms and/or flags incorporating various elements of the arms, including the city of Baltimore, as well as Calvert, Caroline, Baltimore, Howard, and Worcester counties.
From 1986 to 2010, Maryland's standard issue license plates were white with black lettering and a central seal with the flag's unique design. The 1986 plates are still valid and widely seen after being temporarily replaced by a design commemorating the bicentennial of the War of 1812, which had its Chesapeake Campaign in the state. On Monday, September 26, 2016, Maryland offered the option to replace the commemorative War of 1812 license plates with plates featuring a flowing Maryland flag beneath tag number. Maryland driver's licenses also use the pattern of the state flag.
The flag of the short-lived Republic of Maryland—a state established by the Maryland State Colonization Society to "repatriate" freed slaves in Africa—also used Calvert's black and yellow.

Education
The school colors of Towson University, a member of the University System of Maryland, are black and gold, and the university seal incorporates the Calvert and Crossland shield.
The University of Maryland, Baltimore County (UMBC), also in the University System of Maryland, uses all four colors in its main logo.
 The shield of Loyola University Maryland (formerly Loyola College) utilizes both the Calvert shield in its upper-left quadrant, as well as a stylized red and yellow quadrant, symbolic of the Maryland state flag.
 The seal of Johns Hopkins University in Baltimore features the same design and colors as the Maryland flag. The Johns Hopkins colors are sable and gold, taken from the Calvert coat of arms (though the athletic colors are blue and white, as the school mascot is the blue jay).
Goucher College incorporates the flag in its seal.
The school colors of Calvert School, an independent school in Baltimore City, are black and gold.

Sport
 The secondary logo of the Baltimore Ravens professional football team in the National Football League is a shield with alternating Calvert and Crossland Banners interlocked with a stylized "B" and "R".
 The University of Maryland, College Park athletic teams have long used the colors of the state flag. All four colors from the flag are currently used, with the primary colors being red and white, with black and gold used as accent colors. The Maryland flag is also displayed on the right shoulder of the football uniforms. At the start of the 2011 football season, the team unveiled a new uniform designed by Baltimore-based sportswear company Under Armour combining both parts of the flag. Similarly, the men's lacrosse team features designs from the flag on the jersey shoulders.
 Beginning on September 9, 2008, the University of Maryland painted both end zones at SECU Stadium with the flag's two patterns.
The Baltimore Dragon Boat Club features the flag motif in its logo.
Starting with the 2009 season, the Baltimore Orioles major league baseball club has added a patch to the left arm of their uniforms that features a round version of the Maryland flag.
Maryland-based company Under Armour released a line of cleats in 2017, with the Crossland coat of arms design incorporated into the cleats. Under Armour bags also incorporate the flag in its design starting in late 2015 and is seen at its outlet mall locations.
Junior Hockey teams, Maryland Black Bears (NAHL) and Team Maryland (EHL) sport the flag on their team jerseys.

Other
Southwest Airlines painted a Boeing 737-700 in a Maryland state flag theme in 2005, dubbed Maryland One'' in recognition of the airline's hub in Baltimore.
 The world's only full size chain mail/scale mail Maryland flag was created by Brian Galloway, a retired U.S. Air Force veteran from Cecil County.

Legal description
Section 7-202 of the General Provisions Article of the Annotated Code of Maryland provides:
"(a) The State flag is divided into quarters.
(b) The first and fourth quarters are a paly of six pieces, or (gold) and sable
(black), and a bend dexter (right diagonal band) counterchanged so that they consist of six alternating gold and black vertical bars with a diagonal band on which the colors are reversed.
(c) The second and third quarters are quartered argent (white) and gules (red), across bottony counterchanged so that they consist of a quartered field of white and red, charged with a Greek cross that has arms terminating in trefoils and opposite coloring
so that red is on the white quarters and white is on the red quarters, as represented on the escutcheon of the State seal."

The Maryland 
Secretary of State publishes a "Protocol for the Maryland State Flag" which, among other things, specifies the colors of the flag:

1.04. The red and yellow colors in the Maryland flag should conform to the following Pantone Matching System colors:
 red on coated stock: PMS 201
 red on uncoated stock: PMS 193
 yellow on coated stock: PMS 124
 yellow on uncoated stock: PMS 124

Flagpole restrictions
In 1945, the Maryland General Assembly made a gold cross bottony the official ornament for the top of any flagpole carrying the state flag. Maryland is the only state in the union that has a specific guideline not only on how to display the flag but also on what ornament should be on top of the flagpole as well. Sometime before October 10, 2007, Government House (the Governor's Mansion) in Annapolis ceased to display the cross bottony at the top of the flag pole, but the flags at the State House continue to do so (adhering to Maryland General Provisions Code § 7-202 & 7-203 (2016)). In March 2015, the gold cross bottony was put back on top of the flag pole on Government House (Governor's Mansion). All other state government buildings, including public schools, obey this guideline, but many private individuals and businesses do not.

See also

State of Maryland
List of Maryland state symbols
Great Seal of the State of Maryland
Flag of Montgomery County, Maryland

References

External links

History of the Maryland Flag
Protocol for using the Maryland Flag
Information from Flags Of The World
Information from Maryland State Archives

Symbols of Maryland
Maryland
Maryland
Maryland
1904 establishments in Maryland

sv:Maryland#Flaggan